Rounsevell is a surname. Notable people with the surname include:

Ben Rounsevell (1843–1923), Australian politician, brother of John
John Rounsevell ( 1836–1902), Australian pastoralist and politician
William Rounsevell ( 1816–1874), Australian settler and businessman